Ischelandstadion is a multi-use stadium in Hagen, Germany . It is used as the stadium of SSV Hagen matches.  The capacity of the stadium is 16,500 spectators.

External links
 Stadium information

Athletics (track and field) venues in Germany
Football venues in Germany
Buildings and structures in Hagen
Sports venues in North Rhine-Westphalia